Oasis is the annual cultural festival of the Birla Institute of Technology and Science, Pilani. Started back in 1971, it is one of the oldest cultural festivals in India. It is usually held towards the end of October every year. Events are organized for a continuous duration of 96 hours and are completely managed by the student body. It  hosts a variety of events in various categories like Dance, Drama, Literature, Comedy, Fashion and Music. The festival is organized with a different theme every year. In 2022, the festival will observe golden jubilee and the official theme selected is Chapter 50: Demesne of The Lost Gold.

Events

Prof Shows
Prof Shows, an informal short for Professional Shows, feature performances from acclaimed national and international artists.

Chapter 49 (2019) featured performances by Dan Deacon, Nucleya, Biswa Kalyan Rath, Abhishek Raghuram and Sunidhi Chauhan. 

Chapter 50 (2022), hosted after 3 years of the festival's absence owing to the pandemic, featured performances by Till.APES and Peter Cat Recording Co. for the Indie Nite, Sevenn (an international EDM artist) and Seedhe Maut (a desi hip-hop duo) for the EDM Nite and Amit Trivedi. Comedians Gaurav Kapoor and Samay Raina capped the festival with performances at N2O, the college's flagship comedy showcase.

Rocktaves
Rocktaves is a semi-professional  rock festival, featuring performance and competition between Indian rock bands. Bands like Parikrama (won the 1992 edition of Rocktaves, Oasis), Euphoria, Prestorika and Indian Ocean have all started their journey from here.

References 

Birla Institute of Technology and Science, Pilani
College festivals in India
Culfests
Cultural festivals in India
Festivals established in 1971
1971 establishments in India